Chaihu Shugan Wan is a blackish-brown honeyed pill used in Traditional Chinese medicine to "disperse stagnated liver-qi, to activate the flow of qi, to relieve distension and pain". It is used in cases where there is "stagnation of liver qi, distension of chest and hypochondria, indigestion, and acid eructation".

Chinese classic herbal formula

See also
 Chinese classic herbal formula
 Bu Zhong Yi Qi Wan

References

Traditional Chinese medicine pills